Wolfgang Euteneuer (born 1 September 1955) is a retired German football midfielder.

References

External links
 

1955 births
Living people
German footballers
Bundesliga players
VfL Bochum players
VfL Bochum II players
Association football midfielders